Theatre503, formerly the Latchmere Theatre, is a theatre located at 503 Battersea Park Road in Battersea in the London Borough of Wandsworth, above the Latchmere pub. The venue is known for promoting the work of new writers.

History
The theatre was founded in 1982 as the Latchmere Theatre (the name taken from that of the pub downstairs), an offshoot of the Gate Theatre, Notting Hill Gate. It is a custom-built studio theatre. The opening production was a new adaptation of Fear and Loathing in Las Vegas, which proved so successful that the production transferred to the West End.

In 2004 the theatre was renamed as Theatre503 under Artistic Director Paul Higgins, and became a home for new writing. In 2006 Paul Robinson and Tim Roseman were appointed as Artistic Directors with the brief of developing the theatre's profile. Robinson was sole Artistic Director from 2012 to 2016. Under Robinson and Roseman, the venue saw the premiere of works by writers including Duncan Macmillan, Tom Morton-Smith, Anna Jordan, Alice Birch, Charlene James, Katori Hall, Jon Brittain and Phoebe Eclair-Powell. It has won the Peter Brook Empty Space Award and two Olivier Awards, in 2010 for its production of Katori Hall's The Mountaintop and 2017 for Rotterdam by Jon Brittain.

Andrew Shepherd became Executive Director at the beginning of 2016. In August of the same year, Lisa Spirling became Artistic Director, directing the winner of the 2016 Theatre503 International Playwriting Award, In Event of Moone Disaster (October 2017) by Andrew Thompson, nine years after making her directorial debut Cotton Wool by Ali Taylor at the same venue. Steve Harper is the theatre's Literary Manager and has overseen the debuts of more than 1,000 first time writers during his tenure.

Over 120 debut and emerging writers are staged each year in more than 70 productions ranging from one night series of shorts to full length four week runs. In a two year cycle they read and receive over 4,000 scripts including their bi-ennial International Playwriting Award, 503 Five writers-in-residence, unsolicited and their pioneering Rapid Write Response programme.

Winners of The Theatre503 International Playwriting Award
2014: Bea Roberts - And Then Come the Nightjars and Paul Murphy - Valhalla
2016: Andrew Thompson - In Event of Moone Disaster
2018: Danusia Samal - Out of Sorts

The 503Five
Beth Steel, Lou Ramsden, Nimer Rashed, Rex Obano, Richard Marsh (2011–12); Brad Birch, Charlene James, Chris Urch, Gemma Langford, Jon Brittain (2013–14) Brian Mullin, Chloe Todd Fordham, Ella Greenhill, Neasa O'Callaghan, Vinay Patel (2015–16) Aisha Zia, Chris Hogg, Mahad Ali, Ross Willis, Yasmin Joseph (2017–18), Annie Jenkins, Benedict Lombe, Joel Tan, Jon Berry, Zak Mahinfar (2019–20)

Awards and nominations

2020 
Winner
Writers Guild Award, Best New Play (Ross Willis for Wolfie)

2019 
Winner 
Off West End, Best New Play (Ross Willis for Wolfie)
Nominations
Evening Standard Award for Most Promising Playwright (Ross Willis for Wolfie)
Evening Standard Award for Most Promising Playwright (Yasmin Joseph for J'Ouvert)
Broadway World for Best Director (Lisa Spirling for Wolfie)

2018 
Winner
Off West End, Best New Play (Tearrance Arvelle Chisholm for Br'er Cotton)
Stage Debut Award, Best Writer (Andrew Thompson) 
Nominations –
Evening Standard Award for Most Promising Playwright (Tearrance Arvelle Chisholm for Br'er Cotton)
Off West End, Best Supporting Male in a Play (Alexander Campbell for Br'er Cotton
Off West End, Best Video Designer (Louise Rhodes-Brown for Br'er Cotton)

2017 
Winner – Olivier Awards, Outstanding Achievement in an Affiliate Theatre Rotterdam by Jon Brittain (Premiered at Theatre503 in 2015 before transferring to Trafalgar Studios)

Nominations –
Off West End, Best Male in a Play (Graham O'Mara for Punts)
Off West End, Best Male in a Play (Christopher Adams for Punts)
Off West End, Best Male in a Play (Thomas Pickels for In Event of Moone Disaster)
Off West End, Best Director (Audrey Sheffield for The Dark Room)
Off West End, Most Promising New Playwright (Michael McClean for Years of Sunlight)
Off West End, Best Lighting Designer (Will Monks for The Dark Room)

2016
Winner –
Off West End, Best Producer (DEM Productions at Theatre503)

2015
Nominations –
Off West End, Best New Play (Jon Brittain for Rotterdam)
Off West End, Best Set Designer (Ellan Parry for Rotterdam)
Off West End, Best Supporting Female (Jessica Clark for Rotterdam)

2014 
Winner – Argus Angel for Artistic Excellence (Margaret Thatcher Queen of Soho)
Winner – Off West End, Best Set Designer (Signe Beckmann for A Handful of Stars)
Nominations –
Off West End, Best Director (Paul Robinson for A Handful of Stars)
Off West End, Best Sound Designer (Simon Slater for A Handful of Stars)
James Tait Black prize for Drama (Ailis Ni Riain's for Desolate Heaven)
Off West End, Best Set Designer (Petra Hjortsberg for Occupied)
Off West End, Best Supporting Female (Fiz Marcus for Occupied)
Peter Brook Empty Space Award

2013 
Nominations – Off West End Awards:
Paul Robinson for Best Artistic Director
Best Production (Land of Our Fathers)
Most Promising new Playwright (Sam Potter for Mucky Kid)
Best Sound Designer (Simon Slater for The Life of Stuff)
Most Promising Playwright (Jon Brittain and Matt Tedford for Margaret Thatcher Queen of Soho)

2011 
Winner – Off West End Awards:
Most Welcoming Theatre
Best New Musical (Porn – The Musical)
People's Choice Best Female Performance (Jessie Cave for Breed)
Nomination – Most Promising Playwright (Gabriel Bisset-Smith for The Charming Man)
Winner – Off West End Adopt A Playwright Competition – Sarah Grochala

2010 
Winner – Olivier Awards, Best New Play, The Mountaintop by Katori Hall

Nominated – 
Olivier Awards, Best Actress, Lorraine Burroughs for The Mountaintop
WhatsOnStage Awards – Best Actor, David Harewood for The Mountaintop
WhatsOnStage Awards – Best New Play, Katori Hall for The Mountaintop
Alfred Fagon Award – Rex Obano for Slaves

2009 
Nominated – Evening Standard Awards, Most Promising Playwright, Katori Hall for The Mountaintop
Shortlisted – Evening Standard Awards – Best Actor, David Harewood for The Mountaintop
Nominated – TMA Awards, Best New Play, The Lifesavers by Fraser Grace (co-production with Mercury Theatre, Colchester)
Winner – Meyer Whitworth Award, Ali Taylor for Cotton Wool

2008 
Nominated – Peter Brook Empty Space Award

Productions
Landmark Productions
  Wolfie by Ross Willis
  J'Ouvert by Yasmin Joseph
 Br'er Cotton by Tearrance Arvelle Chisholm
 In Event of Moone Disaster by Andrew Thompson
 Rotterdam by Jon Brittain 
 A Handful of Stars by Billy Roche 
 Land of Our Fathers by Chris Urch 
 Margaret Thatcher Queen of Soho by Jon Brittain and Matt Tedford 
 The Mountaintop by Katori Hall 
 Salt Meets Wound by Tom Morton-Smith

References

External links
Theatre 503 Official Site
Theatre 503 Introductory Podcast
What's on listings from 1996 and current shows Arts Archive

Theatres in the London Borough of Wandsworth
Pub theatres in London
Buildings and structures in Battersea
1982 establishments in England